Science and Technology Daily (Keji Ribao) is the official newspaper of the Ministry of Science and Technology of the People's Republic of China. It is published in Chinese and based in Beijing. Historically, it was one of the few Chinese newspapers to cover the 1989 Tiananmen Square protests and massacre. More importantly, by nature, it is regarded as the authority for science and technology issues with objective and scientific perspectives.

References

External links 
 Science and Technology Daily website

1986 establishments in China
Chinese-language newspapers (Simplified Chinese)
Newspapers published in Beijing
Publications established in 1986
Daily newspapers published in China